Countess Katharina Dorothea Elisabeth Finck von Finckenstein (6/7 June 1700 – 26 June 1728) was a member of the German noble family Finck von Finckenstein.

Early life
She was born in Schönberg, East Prussia, and was the daughter of Albrecht Christoph Count Finck von Finckenstein (1661–1730) and Arnolda Charlotte von Creytzen (1673–1749).

Marriage and issue
She married Count Georg Adam III von Schlieben (1688–1737) in Schönberg on 27 November 1720.
They had three children:
Countess Marie Charlotte Luise von Schlieben (1721–1803). She married Count Friedrich Konrad Finck von Finckenstein and had issue.
Count Karl Leopold von Schlieben (1723–1788). One of his daughters, Countess Friederike of Schlieben, was married to Friedrich Karl Ludwig, Duke of Schleswig-Holstein-Sonderburg-Beck, a member of the Danish Royal Family.
Count Georg Adam IV von Schlieben (1728–1795). He married Katharina Elisabeth von der Marwitz and had issue.

References

1700 births
1728 deaths
German countesses
Prussian nobility
People from East Prussia